Yan Guili (born 16 February 1955) also known as Yen Kuei-li is a former international table tennis player from China.

Table tennis career
She won four medals in the World Table Tennis Championships. 

During the 1977 World Table Tennis Championships she won a bronze medal in the mixed doubles with Li Zhenshi. 

Two years later she won double silver in the mixed doubles with Li Zhenshi again  and the women's doubles with Ge Xin'ai.

See also
 List of table tennis players
 List of World Table Tennis Championships medalists

References

1955 births
Living people
Chinese female table tennis players
Table tennis players from Hebei
World Table Tennis Championships medalists